The School of Salamanca is the Renaissance of  thought in diverse intellectual areas by Spanish theologians, rooted in the intellectual and pedagogical work of Francisco de Vitoria. From the beginning of the 16th century the traditional Catholic conception of man and of his relation to God and to the world had been assaulted by the rise of humanism, by the Protestant Reformation and by the new geographical discoveries and their consequences. These new problems were addressed by the School of Salamanca. The name refers to the University of Salamanca, where de Vitoria and other members of the school were based.

The juridical doctrine of the School of Salamanca represented the end of medieval concepts of law, with a revindication of liberty not habitual in Europe of that time. The natural rights of man came to be, in one form or another, the center of attention, including rights as a corporeal being (right to life, economic rights such as the right to own property) and spiritual rights (the right to freedom of thought and to human dignity).

The School of Salamanca reformulated the concept of natural law: law originating in nature itself, with all that exists in the natural order sharing in this law. Their conclusion was, given that all humans share the same nature, they also share the same rights to life and liberty. Such views constituted a novelty in European thought and went counter to those then predominant in Spain and Europe that people indigenous to the Americas had no such rights.

History and leading figures

The School of Salamanca in the broad sense comprises two successive schools of thought, the largely Dominican Salmanticenses, then from the end of the 16th century the Jesuit Conimbricenses of the University of Coimbra, reflecting the general transition of intellectual leadership in the Catholic Church from the Dominicans to the Jesuits. 

The first school began with Francisco de Vitoria (1483–1546), and reached its high point with Domingo de Soto (1494–1560).  Leading Conimbricenses were Luis de Molina (1535–1600), Francisco Suárez (1548–1617), and Giovanni Botero (1544–1617), who would continue the tradition in Italy.

The leading figures of the school, theologians and jurists Francisco de Vitoria, Domingo de Soto, Francisco Suárez, Martín de Azpilcueta (or Azpilicueta), and Tomás de Mercado were all scholars of natural law and of morality, who undertook the reconciliation of the teachings of Thomas Aquinas with the then new political-economic order. 
The themes of study centered on man and his practical problems (morality, economics, jurisprudence, etc.), but almost equally on a particular body of work accepted by all of them, as the ground against which to test their disagreements, including at times bitter polemics within the School.

Sovereignty

The School of Salamanca distinguished two realms of power, the natural or civil realm and the realm of the supernatural, which were often conflated in the Middle Ages through granting royal control of investiture of bishops, or the temporal powers of the pope. One direct consequence of the separation of realms of power is that the king or emperor does not legitimately have jurisdiction over souls, nor does the pope have legitimate temporal power. This included the idea that there are limits on the legitimate powers of government. Thus, according to Luis de Molina a nation is analogous to the mercantile corporations of his time, in that those who govern are holders of power (effectively sovereigns) but a collective power, to which they are subject, derives from them jointly. Nonetheless, in de Molina's view, the power of society over the individual is greater than that of a mercantile corporation over its members, because the power of the government of a nation emanates from God's divine power (as against merely from the power of individuals sovereign over themselves in their business dealings).

At this time, the monarchy of England was extending the theory of the divine right of kings—under which the monarch is the unique legatee of God's power—asserting that subjects must follow the monarch's orders, in order not to contravene God's design. Counter to this, several adherents of the School sustained that the people are the vehicle of divine sovereignty, which they, in turn, pass to a prince under various conditions. In this, the late scholastics were instrumental in the development of early modern theories of political representation. Possibly the one who went furthest in this direction was Francisco Suárez, whose work Defensio Fidei Catholicae adversus Anglicanae sectae errores (The Defense of the Catholic Faith against the errors of the Anglican sect 1613) was the strongest contemporary defense of popular sovereignty. Men are born free by their nature and not as slaves of another man, and can disobey even to the point of deposing an unjust government. As with de Molina, he affirms that political power does not reside in any individual, but he differs subtly in that he considers that the recipient of that power is the people as a whole, not a collection of sovereign individuals—in the same way, Jean-Jacques Rousseau's theory of popular sovereignty would consider the people as a collective group superior to the sum that composes it.

Gabriel Vázquez (1549–1604) held that natural law is not limited to the individual, but obliges societies to respect natural rights and justice.

For Suárez, the political power of society is contractual in origin because the community forms by consensus of free wills. The consequence of this contractualist theory is that the natural form of government is either a democracy or a republic, while oligarchy or monarchy arise as secondary institutions, whose claim to justice is based on consent of the governed organized in a political body.

The law of peoples and international law

Francisco de Vitoria played an important role in the early modern comprehension of ius gentium (the rights of nations). He extrapolated his ideas of legitimate sovereign power to relations between nations, concluding that international society as well ought to be ruled by just forms respecting the rights of all. The common good of the world is of a category superior to the good of each state. This meant that relations between states ought to pass from being justified by force to being justified by law and right. Vitoria has been referred to, along with Grotius, as the “father of international law.”

Francisco Suárez subdivided the concept of ius gentium. Working with already well-formed categories, he carefully distinguished  ius inter gentes from ius intra gentes. Ius inter gentes (which corresponds to modern international law) was a just agreement among the majority of countries, although being positive law, not natural law, it was not necessarily universal. On the other hand, ius intra gentes, or civil law, is specific to each nation.

Many scholars have argued for the importance of Vitoria and Suárez as the forerunners and founders of the International law field, and the precursors of the seminal text De iure belli ac pacis by Grotius. Others, such as Koskenniemi, have argued that none of these humanist and scholastic thinkers can be understood to have founded international law in the modern sense, instead placing its origins in the post-1870 period.

Just war

Given that war is one of the worst evils suffered by mankind, the adherents of the School reasoned that it ought to be resorted to only when it was necessary  to prevent an even greater evil. A diplomatic agreement is preferable, even for the more powerful party, before a war is started.  Examples of "just war" are:
 In self-defense, as long as there is a reasonable possibility of success. If failure is a foregone conclusion, then it is just a wasteful spilling of blood.
 Preventive war against a tyrant who is about to attack.
 War to punish a guilty enemy.

A war is not legitimate or illegitimate simply based on its original motivation: it must comply with a series of additional requirements:
 It is necessary that the response be commensurate with the evil; use of more violence than is strictly necessary would constitute an unjust war.
 Governing authorities declare war, but their decision is not sufficient cause to begin a war. If the people oppose a war, then it is illegitimate. The people have a right to depose a government that is waging, or is about to wage, an unjust war.
 Once war has begun, there remain moral limits to action. For example, one may not attack innocents or kill hostages.
 War is only legitimate as a last resort, after vigorous attempts at negotiation and diplomacy have failed.

Under this doctrine, expansionist wars, wars of pillage, wars to convert infidels or pagans, and wars for glory are all inherently unjust.

The conquest of America

In the 16th century, the School of Salamanca was the first to use the natural law's principle that rights reside in the individual to question the Spanish colonization on the indigenous people of the Americas.

Francisco de Vitoria began his analysis of conquest by rejecting "illegitimate titles". He was the first to dare to question whether the bulls of Alexander VI known collectively as the Bulls of Donation were a valid title of dominion over the newly discovered territories. In this matter he did not accept the universal primacy of the emperor, the authority of the pope (because the pope, according to him, lacked temporal power), nor the claim of voluntary submission or conversion of the Native Americans. One could not dismiss them as sinners or ignorant savages: they were free people by nature, with legitimate property rights. When the Spanish arrived in America they brought no legitimate title to occupy and rule those lands.

Vitoria also analyzed whether there were legitimate claims of title over discovered lands. He elaborated up to eight legitimate titles of dominion. The first and perhaps most fundamental relates to communication between people, who jointly constitute a universal society. Ius peregrinandi et degendi is the universal right to travel and do commerce in all parts of the earth, independently of who governs or what is the religion of the territory. For him, if the "Indians" of the Americas would not permit free transit, the hindered parties had the right to defend themselves and to remain in land obtained in such a war of self-defense.

The second form of legitimate title over discovered lands referred to the right of the Spanish to preach and proselytize. The Indians could voluntarily refuse conversion, but forbidding missionaries would make the matter analogous to the first case. Nonetheless, Vitoria noted that although this can be grounds for a just war, it is not necessarily prudent because of the resulting death and destruction.

The other cases of this casuistry are:
 If the pagan sovereigns force converts to return to idolatry.
 If there come to be a sufficient number of Christians in the newly discovered land that they wish to receive from the Pope a Christian government.
 In the case of overthrowing a tyranny or a government that is harming innocents (e.g. human sacrifice)
 If associates and friends have been attacked—as were the Tlaxcaltecas, allied with the Spanish but subjected, like many other people, to the Aztecs—once again, this could justify a war, with the ensuing possibility of legitimate conquest as in the first case.
 The final "legitimate title" although qualified by Vitoria himself as doubtful, is the suffering of the foreign population from lack of just laws, magistrates, agricultural techniques, etc. In any case, title taken according to this principle must be exercised with Christian charity and for the advantage of the Indians.

Emperor Charles V, then ruler of Spain, took offense to this doctrine of "legitimate" and "illegitimate" titles purporting to limit his prerogatives, and he tried without success to stop its promulgation.

Economics

The School of Salamanca has been described as the "first economic tradition" in the field of economics. This put the origins of economic theory on Europe's mainland, prompting a reassessment of the entire history of the discipline. Much attention has been drawn to the economic thought of the School of Salamanca by Joseph Schumpeter's History of Economic Analysis (1954). It did not coin, but certainly consolidated, the use of the term School of Salamanca in economics. Schumpeter studied scholastic doctrine in general and Spanish scholastic doctrine in particular, and praised the high level of economic science in Spain in the 16th century. He argued that the School of Salamanca most deserves to be considered the founders of economics as a science. The School did not elaborate a complete doctrine of economics, but they established the first modern economic theories to address the new economic problems that had arisen with the end of the medieval order. Unfortunately, there was no continuation of their work until the end of the 17th century and many of their contributions were forgotten, only to be rediscovered later by others.

The thinking of the School was defined as "pro-market, pro-hard money, anti-state in many ways, pro-property, and pro-merchant to a surprising extent."

The English historian of economic thought Marjorie Grice-Hutchinson and Belgian legal historian Wim Decock have published numerous articles and monographs on the School of Salamanca.

Although there does not appear to be any direct influence, the economic thought of the School of Salamanca is in many ways similar to that of the Austrian School. Murray Rothbard referred to them as proto-Austrians.

Antecedents

In 1517, de Vitoria, then at the Sorbonne, was consulted by Spanish merchants based in Antwerp about the moral legitimacy of engaging in commerce to increase one's personal wealth. From today's point of view, one would say they were asking for a consultation about the entrepreneurial spirit. Beginning at that time, Vitoria and other theologians looked at economic matters. They moved away from views that they found to be obsolete, adopting instead new ideas based on principles of natural law.

According to these views, the natural order is based in the "freedom of circulation" of people, goods, and ideas, allowing people to know one another and increase their sentiments of brotherhood. This implies that merchantry is not merely not reprehensible, but that it actually serves the general good.

Private property
The adherents of the School of Salamanca all agreed that property has the beneficial effect of stimulating economic activity, which, in turn, contributed to the general well being. Diego de Covarubias y Leyva (1512–1577) considered that people had not only the right to own property but—again, a specifically modern idea—they had the exclusive right to the benefit from that property, although the community might also benefit. Nonetheless, in times of great necessity, there, all goods become a commons.

Luis de Molina argued that individual owners take better care of their goods than is taken of common property, a form of the tragedy of the commons.

Money, value, and price 

The most complete and methodical developments of a Salamancan theory of value were by Martín de Azpilcueta (1493–1586) and Luis de Molina. Interested in the effect of precious metals arriving from the Americas, de Azpilcueta proved that in the countries where precious metals were scarce, prices for them were higher than in those where they were abundant. Precious metals, like any other mercantile good, gained at least some of their value from their scarcity. This scarcity theory of value was a precursor of the quantitative theory of money put forward slightly later by Jean Bodin (1530–1596).

Up until that time, the predominant theory of value had been the medieval theory based on the cost of production as the sole determinant of a just price (a variant of the cost-of-production theory of value, most recently manifested in the labor theory of value). Diego de Covarrubias and Luis de Molina developed a subjective theory of value and prices, which asserted that the usefulness of a good varied from person to person, so just prices would arise from mutual decisions in free commerce, barring the distorting effects of monopoly, fraud, or government intervention. Expressing this in today's terms, the adherents of the School defended the free market, where the fair price of a good would be determined by supply and demand.

On this Luis Saravia de la Calle wrote in 1544:

Those who measure the just price by the labour, costs, and risk incurred by the person who deals in the merchandise or produces it, or by the cost of transport or the expense of traveling...or by what he has to pay the factors for their industry, risk, and labour, are greatly in error.... For the just price arises from the abundance or scarcity of goods, merchants, and money...and not from costs, labour, and risk.... Why should a bale of linen brought overland from Brittany at great expense be worth more than one which is transported cheaply by sea?... Why should a book written out by hand be worth more than one which is printed, when the latter is better though it costs less to produce?... The just price is found not by counting the cost but by the common estimation.

However the school rarely followed this idea through systematically, and, as Friedrich Hayek has written, "never to the point of realizing that what was relevant was not merely man's relation to a particular thing or a class of things but the position of the thing in the whole...scheme by which men decide how to allocate the resources at their disposal among their different endeavors."

Interest on money
Usury (which in that period meant any charging of interest on a loan) has always been viewed negatively by the Catholic Church. The Third Lateran Council condemned any repayment of a debt with more money than was originally loaned; the Council of Vienne explicitly prohibited usury and declared any legislation tolerant of usury to be heretical; the first scholastics reproved the charging of interest. In the medieval economy, loans were entirely a consequence of necessity (bad harvests, fire in a workplace) and, under those conditions, it was considered morally reproachable to charge interest.

In the Renaissance era, greater mobility of people facilitated an increase in commerce and the appearance of appropriate conditions for entrepreneurs to start new, lucrative businesses. Given that borrowed money was no longer strictly for consumption but for production as well, it could not be viewed in the same manner. The School of Salamanca elaborated various reasons that justified the charging of interest. The person who received a loan benefited; one could consider interest as a premium paid for the risk taken by the loaning party. There was also the question of opportunity cost, in that the loaning party lost other possibilities of utilizing the loaned money. Finally, and perhaps most originally, was the consideration of money itself as a merchandise, and the use of one's money as something for which one should receive a benefit in the form of interest.

Martín de Azpilcueta also considered the effect of time, formulating the time value of money. All things being equal, one would prefer to receive a given good now rather than in the future. This preference indicates greater value. Interest, under this theory, is the payment for the time the loaning individual is deprived of the money.

Theology

In the Renaissance era, theology was generally declining  in the face of the rise of humanism, with scholasticism becoming nothing more than an empty and routine methodology . Under Francisco de Vitoria, the University of Salamanca led a period of intense activity in theology, especially a renaissance of Thomism, whose influence extended to European culture in general, but especially to other European universities. Perhaps the fundamental contribution of the School of Salamanca to theology is the study of problems much closer to humanity, which had previously been ignored, and the opening of questions that had previously not been posed. The term positive theology is sometimes used to distinguish this new, more practical, theology from the earlier scholastic theology.

Morality
In an era when religion permeated everything, to analyze the morality of the acts was considered the most practical and useful study one could undertake to serve society. The novel contributions of the School in law and economics were rooted in concrete challenges and moral problems which confronted society under new conditions.

Over the years a casuistry, a fixed set of answers to moral dilemmas, had been developed. However, by its nature, a casuistry can never be complete, leading to a search for more general rules or principles. From this developed probabilism, where the ultimate criterion was not truth, but the certainty of not choosing evil. Developed principally by Bartolomé de Medina and continued by Gabriel Vázquez and Francisco Suárez, Probabilism became the most important school of moral thought in the coming centuries.

The De auxiliis controversy 

The De auxiliis controversy was a dispute between Jesuits and Dominicans which occurred at the end of the 16th century. The topic of the controversy was grace and predestination, that is to say how one could reconcile the liberty or free will of humans with divine omniscience. In 1582 the Jesuit Prudencio Montemayor and Fray Luis de León spoke publicly about human liberty. Domingo Báñez considered that they gave free will too great a weight and that they used terminology that sounded heretical; he denounced them to the Spanish Inquisition, accusing them of Pelagianism, a belief in human free will to the detriment of the doctrine of original sin and the grace granted by God. Montemayor and de León were banned from teaching and prohibited from defending such ideas.

Báñez was then denounced to the Holy Office by Leon, who accused him of "committing the error of Lutheranism", that is of following the doctrines of Martin Luther. According to Lutheran doctrine, man is "dead in his trespasses" (Ephesians 2:1) as a consequence of original sin and cannot save himself by his own merit; only God can save man, "For by grace you have been saved through faith. And this is not your own doing; it is the gift of God, not a result of works, so that no one may boast." (Ephesians 2:8–9) Báñez was acquitted.

Nonetheless, this did not end the dispute, which Luis de Molina continued with his Concordia liberi arbitrii cum gratiae donis (1588). This is considered the best expression of the Jesuit position. The polemic continued over the course of years, including an attempt by the Dominicans to get Pope Clement VIII to condemn the Concordia of de Molina. Finally Paul V in 1607 recognized the liberty of Dominicans and Jesuits to defend their ideas, prohibiting that either side of this disagreement be characterized as heresy.

The existence of evil in the world
The existence of evil in a world created and ruled by an infinitely good and powerful God has long been viewed as paradoxical. (See Problem of evil). Vitoria reconciled the paradox by arguing first that free will is a gift from God to each person. It is impossible that each person will always freely choose only the good. Thus, evil results from man's ability not to choose good, by virtue of his free will.

Members  
There is discussion about which authors can be assigned to the name of the School of Salamanca, or if one can speak of a School of Salamanca in the first place, but the consensus revolves around the name of Francisco de Vitoria, considered a central figure of the movement . From him, authors refer to three stages, counting in the first the pupils of Vitoria and their pupils, in the second Salamanca contemporaries who had no direct relationship with him and in the third external figures influenced by this current of thought. 

First group
 Arias Piñel (1512-1563)
 Antonio de Padilla y Meneses (-1580)
 Bartolomé de Albornoz (1519-1573)
 Bartolomé de Medina (1527-1581)
 Diego de Chaves (1507-1592)
 Diego de Covarrubias (1512-1577)
 Diego Pérez de Mesa (1563-1632)
 Domingo Báñez (1528-1604)
 Domingo de Soto (1494-1560)
 Fernán Pérez de Oliva (1494-1531)
 Francisco de Vitoria (1492-1546)
 Francisco Sarmiento de Mendoza (1525-1595)
 Francisco Suárez (1548-1617)
 Gregorio de Valencia (1549-1603)
 Jerónimo Muñoz (1520-1591)
 Juan de Horozco y Covarrubias (1540-1610)
 Juan de la Peña (1513-1565)
 Juan de Matienzo (1520-1579)
 Juan de Ribera (1532-1611)
 Juan Gil de la Nava (-1551)
 Leonardus Lessius (1554-1623)
 Luis de León (1527-1591)
 Martín de Azpilcueta (1492-1586)
 Martín de Ledesma (1509-1574)
 Melchor Cano (1509-1560)
 Pedro de Sotomayor (1511-1564)
 Tomás de Mercado (1523-1575)

Second group
 Alonso de la Vera Cruz (1507-1584)
 Cristóbal de Villalón (-1588)
 Fernando Vázquez de Menchaca (1512-1569)
 Francisco Cervantes de Salazar (-1575)
 Juan de Lugo y Quiroga (1583-1660)
 Juan de Salas (1553-1612)
 Luis de Molina (1535-1600)
 Pedro de Aragón (1545-1546)
 Pedro de Valencia (1555-1620)

Third group
 Antonio de Hervías (-1590)
 Bartolomé de Carranza (1503-1576)
 Bartolomé de las Casas (1484-1566)
 Cristóbal de Fonseca (1550-1621)
 Domingo de Salazar (1512-1594)
 Domingo de Santo Tomás (1499-1570)
 Gabriel Vásquez (1549-1604)
 Gómez Pereira (1500–1567) 
 Juan de Mariana (1536-1624)
 Juan de Medina (1489-1545)
 Juan Pérez de Menacho (1565-1626)
 Luis de Alcalá (1490-1549)
 Luis Saravia de la Calle (?)
 Miguel Bartolomé Salón (1539-1621)
 Pedro de Fonseca (1528-1599)
 Pedro de Oñate (1567-1646)
 Rodrigo de Arriaga (1592-1667)

See also

 Conimbricenses
 Second scholasticism
 Casuistry
 Rule According to Higher Law
 Social contract
 Valladolid debate
 Spanish Universalist School of the 18th century

References

Bibliography

 Alves, André Azevedo (2010). The Salamanca School (Major Conservative and Libertarian Thinkers), edited by John Meadowcroft, Continuum International Publishing.
 
 Chojnowski, Peter (January 2005) "'Corporation Christendom': The True School of Salamanca". The Angelus XXVIII (1). Kansas City, MO: Angelus Press. . Contends that the alleged economic liberalism is based on a misreading of scholastic texts.
 Grice-Hutchinson, Marjorie (1952). The School of Salamanca: Readings in Spanish Monetary Theory, 1544–1605
 Grice-Hutchinson, Marjorie (1978). Early Economic Thought in Spain, 1177–1740.
 Grice-Hutchinson, Marjorie (1993). Economic thought in Spain. Selected Essays of Marjorie Grice-Hutchinson, edited with an introduction by Laurence Moss and Christopher K. Ryan.
 Liggio, Leonard P. (Jan & Feb 2000) "The Heritage of the Spanish Scholastics". Religion & Liberty. 10 (1). Grand Rapids, MI: Acton Institute.
 
 Rothbard, Murray, New Light on the Prehistory of the Austrian School Essay originally published in The Foundations of Modern Austrian Economics, edited by Edwin Dolan (Kansas City: Sheed and Ward, 1976), pp. 52–74.
 Schumpeter, Joseph (1954). History of Economic Analysis. New York: Oxford University Press.
 : Puts into context of truce negotiations 1608–1809. Ittersum (p. 18) notes  Grotius' citing of School of Salamanca figures, as well as the Ancient Greek, Roman and early Church Fathers (p. 12).

External links
 The School of Salamanca A Digital Collection of Sources and a Dictionary of its Juridical-Political Language. 
 
 The School of Salamanca on the History of Economic Thought website.

 
Ethical schools and movements
Economic history of Spain
History of Catholicism in Spain
Scholasticism
Preclassical economics
Legal history of Spain
Thomas Aquinas
Popular sovereignty
University of Salamanca